Luka Koblar (born 8 August 1999) is a Slovenian footballer who plays as a defender for Aluminij.

Career
Koblar started his career with NK Maribor, Slovenia's most successful club.

For the second half of 2019–20, he was sent on loan to NK Aluminij in the Slovenian top flight.

On 28 May 2021 he joined Frosinone.

In January 2022, he moved to Potenza on loan from Frosinone.

On 1 July 2022 he has been released by Frosinone.

References

External links
 

1999 births
Living people
Slovenian footballers
Slovenia youth international footballers
Slovenia under-21 international footballers
Association football defenders
NK Maribor players
NK Aluminij players
Frosinone Calcio players
Potenza Calcio players
Slovenian PrvaLiga players
Slovenian expatriate footballers
Expatriate footballers in Italy
Slovenian expatriate sportspeople in Italy